Rails Rumble is an annual virtual hackathon competition for developers using Ruby on Rails. It is similar in spirit to Rails Day. Borrowing from the format of the 48 Hour Film Project, Rails Rumble was the pioneer of the 48-hour hackathon model, giving teams of 1-4 developers a weekend to design, develop, and deploy the best web application they can in the allotted time. Finished entries are rated and commented on during a public judging period, after which awards are presented.

The first competition was held from September 8–9, 2007. Starting in 2016 Rails Rumble has been rebranded to Ruby Rampage, echoing the desire of the organizers to include all Ruby-based web frameworks.

External links
Official Rails Rumble Website

Programming contests